The Safety Pharmacology Society (SPS) is a global scientific society fostering best practice around the discipline of safety pharmacology. The Society has a mission statement which declares it is a nonprofit organization that promotes knowledge, development, application, and training in safety pharmacology—a distinct scientific discipline that integrates the best practices of pharmacology, physiology and toxicology. The objective of safety pharmacology studies is to further the discovery, development and safe use of biologically active chemical entities and large molecules by the identification, monitoring and characterization of potentially undesirable pharmacodynamic activities in nonclinical studies. The Safety Pharmacology Society also supports the human safety of drugs and biologicals by fostering scientific research, education, and dissemination of scientific information through meetings and other scientific interactions.

The Safety Pharmacology Society was incorporated in 2000, at the time when the International Conference on Harmonisation of Technical Requirements for Registration of Pharmaceuticals for Human Use was issuing ICH S7A, a regulatory guidance covering safety pharmacology and drafting ICH S7B which is more specific to potential effects of new drugs on cardiac repolarization. Prior to 2001 many of the same scientific experts met once a year in Philadelphia. The historical birth of safety pharmacology is described by Alan Bass, Lewis Kinter, Patricia Williams. Two of the authors, Alan Bass and Lewis Kinter, are past presidents of the Safety Pharmacology Society.

The Safety Pharmacology Society is composed of members from across the globe and reaches out internationally through meetings, webinars and publications. The Society provides a number of resources that are available to members and nonmembers. The Safety Pharmacology Society also offers a certification exam, Diplomate in Safety Pharmacology (DSP). The certification examination is offered online one time a year.

The key values of the SPS embrace scientific excellence, knowledge, improving human and animal life, collaboration and cooperation, integrity, quality, and respect for individual diversity, initiative, education and personal development.

The Safety Pharmacology Society organizes an annual meeting in the Fall, comprising invited speakers, posters, continuing education courses and exhibits. This meeting has alternated between North America and Europe. Recent meetings have been held in:
Montréal, Canada (2022)
Barcelona, Spain (2019)
Washington, District of Columbia (2018)
Berlin, Germany (2017)
Vancouver, British Columbia, Canada (2016)
Prague, Czech Republic (2015)
Washington, District of Columbia (2014)
Rotterdam, Netherlands (2013)
Phoenix, Arizona (2012)
Innsbruck, Austria (2011)
Boston, Massachusetts (2010)
Strasbourg, France (2009)
Madison, Wisconsin (2008)
Edinburgh, United Kingdom (2007)
San Diego, California (2006)
Mannheim, Germany (2005)
Covington, Kentucky (2004)
Noordwyk, Netherlands (2003)
Philadelphia, Pennsylvania (2002)
Chicago, Illinois (2001)
The Safety Pharmacology Society also organizes local (regional) meetings and webinars.

References 

Health care-related professional associations based in the United States
Pharmacological societies